This article lists all poor law unions in Ireland.

Antrim
Antrim, Ballycastle, Ballymena, Ballymoney, Belfast, Larne, Lisburn

Armagh
Armagh, Lurgan, Newry

Carlow
Carlow, Bawnboy

Cavan
Bailieborough, Bawnboy, Cavan, Cootehill

Clare
Ballyvaughan, Corofin, Ennis, Ennistymon, Kildysart (Killadysert), Kilrush, Scariff, Tulla

Cork
Bandon, Bantry, Castletownbere, Clonakilty, Cork, Dunmanway, Fermoy, Kanturk, Kilmallock, Kinsale, Macroom, Mallow, Midleton, Millstreet, Mitchelstown, Skibbereen, Blackpool, Carrigtwohill, Wilton,

Donegal
Ballyshannon, Donegal, Dunfanaghy, Glenties, Inishowen, Letterkenny, Milford, Stranorlar

Down
Banbridge, Downpatrick, Kilkeel, Newry, Newtownards

Dublin
Balrothery, Dublin North, Dublin South, Rathdown

Fermanagh
Enniskillen, Lisnaskea, Lowtherstown

Galway
Ballinasloe, Clifden, Galway, Glenamaddy, Gort, Loughrea, Mountbellew, Oughterard, Portumna, Tuam

Kerry
Cahirciveen, Dingle, Kenmare, Killarney, Listowel, Tralee

Kildare
Athy, Celbridge, Naas

Kilkenny
Callan, Castlecomer, Kilkenny, Thomastown, Urlingford

Laois
Abbeyleix, Donaghmore, Mountmellick

Leitrim
Carrick-on-Shannon, Manorhamilton, Mohill

Limerick
Croom, Glin, Kilmallock, Limerick, Newcastle, Rathkeale

Londonderry
Coleraine, Derry Workhouse, Magherafelt, Newtown Limavady

Longford
Ballymahon, Granard, Longford

Louth
Ardee, Drogheda, Dundalk

Mayo
Ballina, Ballinrobe, Belmullet, Castlebar, Claremorris, Killala, Newport, Swineford, Westport

Meath
Castletowndevlin, Dunshaughlin, Kells, Navan, Oldcastle, Trim

Monaghan
Carrickmacross, Castleblaney (Castleblayney), Clones, Monaghan

Offaly
Edenderrry, Parsonstown, Tullamore

Roscommon
Boyle, Castlerea, Roscommon, Strokestown

Sligo
Dromore West, Sligo, Tubbercurry

Tipperary
Borrisokane, Carrick-on-Suir, Cashel, Cashel, Clogheen, Clonmel, Nenagh, Roscrea, Thurles, Tipperary

Tyrone
Castlederg, Clogher, Cookstown, Dungannon, Gortin, Omagh, Strabane

Waterford
Dungarvan, Kilmacthomas, Lismore, Waterford

Westmeath
Athlone, Mullingar

Wexford
Enniscorthy, Gorey, New Ross, Wexford

Wicklow
Baltinglass, Rathdrum, Shillelagh

References

Poor Law Unions
Poor Law Unions
Poor law unions